Alice May Oseman (born 16 October 1994) is an English author of young adult fiction. She secured her first publishing deal at 17, and had her first novel Solitaire published in 2014. Her novels include Radio Silence, I Was Born for This, and Loveless. She wrote and illustrated the webcomic Heartstopper, which has been published as multiple graphic novels and which she adapted into a TV series, earning her two Children's and Family Emmy Awards as both a writer and producer. Her novels focus on contemporary teenage life in the UK and have received the Inky Awards.

Early life and education
Alice Oseman was born to Jewish parents in Chatham, Kent and grew up in a village near Rochester, Kent with her younger brother, William, and attended Rochester Grammar School. She graduated with a Bachelor of Arts in English literature from Durham University in 2016. Oseman uses she/her and they/them pronouns.

Career
Oseman's debut novel Solitaire was published by HarperCollins in 2014 after a bidding war. It follows the story of Tori Spring, a pessimistic teenager, who meets Michael, her polar opposite and an unbelievable optimist. They attempt to find out who is behind a series of pranks at their school. Other characters include Tori's brother Charlie, who has a severe eating disorder and is explored further in Oseman's webcomic Heartstopper. The novel explores themes such as friendship, mental health issues, eating disorders, and LGBT+ relationships.

In 2016, Oseman published her second novel, Radio Silence. The novel follows Frances Janvier, a high-achiever whose life revolves around her admission to Cambridge, who meets the shy creator behind her favourite podcast, Aled Last. Themes such as academic pressures and LGBT+ relationships and identities are central to the novel. According to Oseman, Frances' experience in Radio Silence is similar to her own school pressure and a later disillusionment with academia following her education at Durham University. This novel has been praised for representing characters of various ethnicities, genders, and sexualities. Radio Silence was named as one of Bank Street Children's Book Committee's Best Books of the Year in 2017. Oseman has often written about the importance of writing diversely on her blog, and has spoken about the lack of diversity in Solitaire in interviews. The novel won the 2017 Silver Inky Award for young adult literature.

Oseman's third book, I Was Born for This, was published in May 2018. It follows the story of Fereshteh "Angel" Rahimi and Jimmy Kaga-Ricci. The story is about a band called The Ark and their fandom, with a particular focus on fandom among teenagers. Isabella Stocka, an author at The Nerd Daily, said that she "would have liked it to be a bit different and perhaps another chapter or two would not have hurt the story."

Oseman is also the author and artist of the web comic Heartstopper, which follows the romantic relationship between Charlie Spring (brother of Tori Spring) and Nick Nelson, both of whom are characters featured in Solitaire. The first four volumes of the comic have been acquired by Hachette Children's Group. Volume one was published in October 2018, volume two in July 2019, volume three in February 2020 and volume four in May 2021.

Oseman published two ebook novellas based on characters from Solitaire and Heartstopper, titled Nick and Charlie (July 2015) and This Winter (November 2015). Both were published by HarperCollins Children's Books.

Oseman's novels have been praised for being "relatable" and realistic regarding their portrayal of contemporary teenage life. Her first book Solitaire was particularly praised due to her young age at the time of the publishing deal, which contributed to a BBC Breakfast interview on 22 July 2014.

In 2018, to celebrate the release of a third young adult novel, I Was Born for This, all of Oseman's published books received new, matching covers. The re-designed covers were released in May, along with the new book.

In July 2020, Oseman published Loveless, a young adult novel based on her own experiences in university.

Adaptations

See-Saw Films optioned the television rights to Heartstopper in 2019. On 20 January 2021, it was revealed that a live-action television adaptation of Heartstopper was ordered to series by Netflix, with Oseman writing the script and Euros Lyn directing. Patrick Walters of See-Saw Films serves as executive producer. Kit Connor and Joe Locke star as Nick and Charlie respectively. It premiered on 22 April 2022.

On 20 May 2022, Netflix announced that the series was being recommissioned for a second and third season.

Personal life
While promoting Loveless, Oseman opened up about being aromantic asexual. Oseman uses she/her and they/them pronouns.

Bibliography

Solitaire
 Solitaire (HarperCollins young adult books, 2014)

Novellas
 Nick and Charlie (ebook, HarperCollins young adult books, 16 July 2015)
 This Winter (ebook, HarperCollins young adult books, 5 November 2015)

Heartstopper
Heartstopper (2017)
 Heartstopper: Volume 1 (Hodder young adult books, 7 February 2019)
 Heartstopper: Volume 2 (Hodder young adult books, 11 July 2019)
 Heartstopper: Volume 3 (Hodder young adult books, 6 February 2020)
 Heartstopper: Volume 4 (Hodder young adult books, 6 May 2021)
 Heartstopper: Volume 5 (to be released 2 February 2023 – readable on Webtoon)

Standalones
 Radio Silence (HarperCollins young adult books, 26 February 2016)
 I Was Born for This (HarperCollins young adult books, 3 May 2018)
 Loveless (HarperCollins young adult books, 9 July 2020)

Awards and nominations

Book awards

Television awards

Notes

References

External links 
 
 

Living people
1994 births
20th-century LGBT people
21st-century English women writers
21st-century LGBT people
Alumni of Durham University
Aromantic women
Asexual women
British child writers
British writers of young adult literature
British women television writers
Emmy Award winners
English graphic novelists
English screenwriters
English LGBT writers
English webcomic creators
People educated at Rochester Grammar School
People from Chatham, Kent